Travis Sullivan's Björkestra is an 18-piece, genre-bending jazz orchestra from New York City. The band is led by alto saxophonist Travis Sullivan with arrangements by Sullivan, Kevin Schmidt, and Kelly Pratt. The Björkestra performs the music of eclectic musician Björk.

History 
Since its debut in September 2004 at the Knitting Factory in New York City, Travis Sullivan's Björkestra has performed around the country.  They have been mentioned in  The Wall Street Journal, Relix Magazine, and Jazz Times. In 2007 Sullivan conducted his arrangements with the Sicilian Jazz Orchestra to a sold-out crowd at Teatro Golden in Palermo, Sicily.

Members of Travis Sullivan's Björkestra—often referred to as The Björkestra—have performed with Arcade Fire, Dr. Dre, Charlie Hunter, The Spam All Stars, Maria Schneider, and the Saturday Night Live Band.  Guests have included saxophonist Donny McCaslin and guitarists Kurt Rosenwinkel and Ben Monder.  The ensemble includes vocalist Becca Stevens.

Members 
 Travis Sullivan – alto saxophone
 Eli Asher – trumpet
 Ravi Best – trumpet
 Kevin Bryan – trumpet
 Brian Pareschi – trumpet
 Alan Ferber – trombone
 James Hirschfeld – trombone
 Ryan Keberle – trombone
 Kevin L. Schmidt – bass trombone
 Sean Nowell – tenor saxophone
 Steve Welsh – tenor saxophone
 Lauren Sevian – baritone saxophone
 David Cook – piano, keyboard
 Art Hirahara – piano keyboard
 Yoshi Waki – double bass, bass guitar
 Joe Abbatantuono – drums
 Ian Cook]] – electronic percussion
 Becca Stevens – vocals

Discography 
 Enjoy! (Koch, 2008)
 I Go Humble (Zoho, 2013)

References

External links 
 Official  site

American jazz ensembles from New York City
Tribute bands